Pebble Township is one of fourteen townships in Dodge County, Nebraska, United States. The population was 423 at the 2020 census. A 2021 estimate placed the township's population at 412.

Most of the Village of Snyder lies within the Township.

See also
County government in Nebraska

References

External links
City-Data.com

Townships in Dodge County, Nebraska
Townships in Nebraska